Mikhail Khodunov (born 8 December 1994) is a Belarusian footballer who plays for Polotsk.

References

External links
 
 
 Profile at teams.by

1994 births
Living people
Belarusian footballers
Association football midfielders
FC Naftan Novopolotsk players
FC Polotsk players